The Renkyō Line (連京線; in Chinese Lianjing Line, Liánjīng Xiàn) was the primary trunk line of the South Manchuria Railway from 1907 to 1945. The  line ran between Dalian (Dairen) and Changchun (Xinjing).

The rights to manage this railway line was one of the main concessions that Japan acquired from Russia after the Russo-Japanese War. It played an important role in Japan's control of Manchuria, as a key connection in traffic between east Asia and Europe and as a means of conveying resources mined inland to the coast. The line's importance to freight traffic decreased somewhat after the opening of the shorter North Chosen Line via the Korean port of Rajin. It remained important to passenger traffic, however, as the "Asia Express" Dalian–Harbin limited express train, inaugurated in 1943, operated on this line between Dalian and Xinjing. In August 1945, after Japan's defeat in the Pacific War, control of this and all other Mantetsu lines was passed to the Sino-Soviet China Changchun Railway.

History
The Renkyō Line began as the "South Manchuria Line" of the Russian-owned Chinese Eastern Railway running from Harbin to Port Arthur. Russia obtained the rights to build this line from Qing China; work began on 27 March 1898, and the  broad gauge line was opened to traffic in July 1903. Following Russia's defeat in the Russo-Japanese War, Japan gained the rights to operate the Harbin–Lüshun (Ryojun) section of the CER; the line was then converted from Russian broad gauge to the  Cape gauge used in Japan, to allow the use of rolling stock from Japan. The line was operated by the Imperial Japanese Army until it was taken over by the South Manchuria Railway Company (Mantetsu), established on 26 November 1906. Mantetsu immediately set to regauging the line again, this time from Cape gauge to  standard gauge.

Mantetsu created the Renkyō Line - then called the Manchu Main Line (満洲本線, Manshū Honsen, Mǎnzhōu Běnxiàn) - between Dairen and Mengjiatun (Mōkaton) on 1 April 1907, and extending it to Changchun (Chōshun) on 1 September 1907. Regauging of the entire line was completed in 1908, and on 27 May of that year through service between Dairen and Chōshun began on the all-standard gauge line. The Anpō Line, which connected to the Renkyō Line at Fengtian (Hōten) and was initially built as a  narrow-gauge line, was converted to standard gauge in November 1911, and from 15 June 1912 direct operation between Busan and Changchun began, via the Chosen Government Railway's Gyeongbu and Gyeongui Lines, the Anpō Line, and the Renkyō Line from Fengtian to Changchun. Double-tracking of the line from Sujiatun (Sokaton) to Dairen was completed on 27 October 1908, but it wasn't until 30 November 1918 that the section from Sujiatun to Fengtian was doubled. Between 1919 and 1926 the entire line was relaid with 100-lb/yd (50 kg/m) rail. The first colour light signals for automatic block signalling were installed on the Dalian–Jinzhou (Kinshū) and Fengtian–Sujiatun sections on 12 February 1924, and the entire section from Dalian to Fengtian received automatic blocking by 5 November 1933. On 15 July 1927, the line's name was changed from Manchu Main Line to Renchō Line (連長線; "Lianchang Line", Liáncháng Xiàn, in Chinese).

Using the Mukden Incident as a pretext to invade Manchuria, Japan created the puppet state of Manchukuo in March 1932; Changchun was designated the capital city, and was renamed Xinjing (Shinkyō), and the line was renamed once again, becoming the Renkyō Line at that time. The "Asia Express", a world-class limited express train, was introduced on 26 September 1934 between Dalian and Xinjing. The Manchukuo National Railway, which had taken over the remainder of the Chinese Eastern Railway, finished the conversion of the Jingbin Line from Xinjing to Harbin from broad gauge to standard gauge on 31 August 1935, and from 1 September the Asia Express service was extended to Harbin.

Japan's deteriorating situation in the Pacific War affected the line significantly. The Asia Express was suspended at the end of February 1943. The loss of air and sea superiority led to a drastic reduction in freight traffic to the port at Dalian, being instead redirected to Korean ports, via the North Chosen Line to the ports of Rajin and Unggi, and via the Anpō Line and the Chosen Government Railway to Busan. Between 1 August and 3 November 1944, the second track of the  section between Sanshilibao (Sanjūrihō) and Dashiqiao (Daisekikyō) was removed, with the railways being used to upgrade Mantetsu's Anpō Line and the Manchukuo National Railway's Fengshan Line from Fengtian to Shanhaiguan.

On 9 August 1945, the Soviet Union invaded Manchukuo, and on the 14th, the USSR and the Republic of China signed a treaty of friendship; the signing of the treaty was announced on the 27th. Under the terms of this treaty, a Sino-Soviet joint enterprise was formed, called the China Changchun Railway, to operate the Renkyō Line (known as the Changda Line after Xinjing reverted to its original name, Changchun) and a number of lines formerly owned by the Manchukuo National Railway, including the Xinjing–Harbin Jingbin Line and the Harbin–Manzhouli Binzhou Line. Mantetsu was formally dissolved on 30 September 1945. The China Changchun Railway was transferred to China Railway in 1955, after which the Changda Line was split up, with the Dalian–Shenyang section becoming the Shenda Railway, and the Shenyang–Changchun section becoming part of the Beijing–Harbin Jingha Railway.

Services
In addition to many freight trains and local passenger trains, a number of domestic and international express and limited express trains operated on this line. Most important of these was the flagship "Asia Express", running between Dalian and Harbin from 1934 to 1943, which was comparable to the most prestigious European and American express trains of the day, which featured several world firsts, such as fully enclosed, air-conditioned carriages. The "Hato" express operated from 1932 to 1945, running between Dalian and Xinjing. There were two international express services serving Korea and Manchukuo: the "Hikari" between Busan and Harbin, which operated from 1934 to 1945, and the "Nozomi", which ran between Busan and Xinjing.

Route
In the "Stops" columns, ● indicates a stop made by all trains of that category, ▲ indicates a stop made only by some trains of that category, ○ indicates a stop made by all trains of that category after October 1939, and | indicates that trains of that category did not stop at that station. Ordinary passenger trains stopped at all stations except signal stops.

References

Railway lines in China
Standard gauge railways in China
Railway lines in Manchukuo
Mantetsu railway lines
Railway lines opened in 1905
1905 establishments in China